Luxbacher is a surname. Notable people with the surname include:

 Bernhard Luxbacher (born 1994), Austrian football player
 Daniel Luxbacher (born 1992), Austrian football player
 Irene Luxbacher (born 1970), Canadian artist and author
 Joe Luxbacher (born 1951), American football player